The 1978 United States Senate election in Oregon took place on November 7, 1978. Incumbent Republican Senator Mark Hatfield was re-elected to a third term in office, defeating Democrat Vernon Cook.

Republican primary

Candidates
Mark Hatfield, incumbent Senator
Bert W. Hawkins
Robert D. Maxwell
Richard L. Schnepel

Results

Democratic primary

Candidates
Steve Anderson, attorney from Salem and candidate for U.S. Representative in 1960 and 1974
Jack A. Brown
Vernon Cook, state legislator from Gresham and candidate for U.S. Representative in 1970 and 1974
John Sweeney, candidate for Mayor of Portland in 1968

Results

General election

Results

See also 
 1978 United States Senate elections

References 

1978
Oregon
United States Senate